
Year 361 (CCCLXI) was a common year starting on Monday (link will display the full calendar) of the Julian calendar. At the time, it was known as the Year of the Consulship of Taurus and Florentius (or, less frequently, year 1114 Ab urbe condita). The denomination 361 for this year has been used since the early medieval period, when the Anno Domini calendar era became the prevalent method in Europe for naming years.

Events 
 By place 
 Roman Empire 
 November 3 – Emperor Constantius II dies of a fever at Mopsuestia in Cilicia, age 44; on his deathbed he is baptised, and declares his cousin Julian the Apostate rightful successor.  
 December 11 – Julian becomes sole emperor of the Roman Empire; he rules from Constantinople, and tries to restore paganism. Constantius II is buried in the Church of the Holy Apostles.
 Ministers and followers of Constantius II are put on trial, at the Chalcedon Tribunal.

 China 
 July 10 – Sixteen Kingdoms: Jin Aidi, age 20, succeeds Jin Mudi, as emperor of the Eastern Jin Dynasty.

 By topic 
 Art 
 361–363 – A Julian the Apostate coin is issued. It is now kept at the British Museum, London.

 Medicine 
 Constantinople enforces a strict licensing system for physicians.

 Religion 
 Emperor Julian tries to organize a pagan church and substitute it for Christianity. Pope Liberius repudiates the Arian creed, and declares that the Council of Arminium has no authority to issue decrees.
 Gregory Nazianzus (Saint Gregory the Theologian) returns to Nazianzus and is appointed a priest by his father, who wants him to assist local Christians.
 Construction of the Monastery of Saint Anthony in the Eastern Desert of Egypt begins.
 December 24 – George of Cappadocia, the Arian intruding bishop of Alexandria, is murdered in his see and Athanasius of Alexandria returns to his native city in triumph.

Births

Deaths 

 November 3 – Constantius II, Roman Emperor (b. 317)
 December 24
 George of Cappadocia, Byzantine Orthodox archbishop and saint
 George of Laodicea, Byzantine Orthodox archbishop and saint

Date unknown 
 Apodemius, Roman officer and secret agent
 Eusebius, Roman officer 
 Jin Mudi, emperor of the Eastern Jin Dynasty (b. 343)
 Li Shi, emperor of the Chinese Ba-Di state Cheng Han
 Maximus of Naples, Roman Catholic archbishop and saint
 Song Hun, regent of the Chinese state Former Liang
 Wang Xizhi, Chinese calligrapher (b. 303)
 Zhu Jingjian, Chinese Buddhist nun (b. 292)

References